Kenichi Sako (佐古 賢一, born 17 July 1970) is a Japanese former basketball player.

Head coaching record

|- 
| style="text-align:left;"|Hiroshima Dragonflies
| style="text-align:left;"|2014-15
| 54||21||33|||| style="text-align:center;"|3rd in Western|||2||0||2||
| style="text-align:center;"|5th
|-
| style="text-align:left;"|Hiroshima Dragonflies
| style="text-align:left;"|2015-16
| 55||17||38|||| style="text-align:center;"|9th|||-||-||-||
| style="text-align:center;"|
|-
| style="text-align:left;"|Hiroshima Dragonflies
| style="text-align:left;"|2016-17
| 60||46||14|||| style="text-align:center;"|2nd in B2 Western|||5||2||3||
| style="text-align:center;"|3rd in B2
|-

References

External links
Highlights

1970 births
Living people
Akita Isuzu/Isuzu Motors Lynx/Giga Cats players
Hiroshima Dragonflies coaches
Japanese men's basketball players
Japan national basketball team coaches
Asian Games medalists in basketball
Basketball players at the 1994 Asian Games
Basketball players at the 2006 Asian Games
Asian Games bronze medalists for Japan
Japanese basketball coaches
SeaHorses Mikawa players
1998 FIBA World Championship players
Medalists at the 1994 Asian Games
People from Iwakuni, Yamaguchi
Sportspeople from Yamaguchi Prefecture
Universiade medalists in basketball
Universiade silver medalists for Japan
Medalists at the 1995 Summer Universiade
FIBA Hall of Fame inductees